Hawthorndene is a south-eastern suburb located in the Foothills of the Mount Lofty Ranges of Adelaide, South Australia.

Hawthorndene is home to the popular Apex Park with two tennis courts and a large family playground with Barbecue and toilet facilities. The park is next to "Joan's Pantry" Cafe & Restaurant which underwent major renovations in 2016. Joan's Pantry was first opened in 1920. It overlooks Hawthorndene Oval and has a Community Garden.

Hawthorndene is also home to the Blackwood CFS South Australian Country Fire Service Station which is located on Gorse Ave, Hawthorndene.

History
The original subdivision of Hawthorndene was created by A.E. and D.J. Hewett on part sections 871–2, Hundred of Adelaide in 1925; however, it was not until 1988 that its boundaries were completely formalised.  Its name refers to the many Hawthorn bushes growing along Minno Creek as a result of seeds being washed down the creek from the Hawthorn maze in the Belair National Park and from a Hawthorn hedge planted by C. Legh Winser around his orchard in what is now Glenalta. When the majority of the population and houses that are there now were put in, the suburb was called "Blackwood Estate".

Transport

Blackwood Forest Recreation Park

In 1908, the Government of South Australia acquired  for use as an experimental orchard.  It was planted with various fruit and nut trees by the Department of Agriculture and, in 1952, a small area was planted with Radiata Pines.  In 1968, management was transferred to the Woods and Forest Department and, in 1972, the remaining fruit trees were removed and more pines were planted.  However, by 1985, after community opposition to a plan to harvest the timber, the land was resumed and held as vacant Crown Land.  After further opposition to attempts to dispose of the land, led by the community based Save the Blackwood Forest Committee, it was proclaimed a recreation park in November 2001.

References

Suburbs of Adelaide